The 1999 West Virginia Mountaineers football team represented West Virginia University in the 1999 NCAA Division I-A football season. It was the Mountaineers' 107th overall and 9th season as a member of the Big East Conference (Big East). The team was led by head coach Don Nehlen, in his 20th year, and played their home games at Mountaineer Field in Morgantown, West Virginia. They finished the season with a record of four wins and seven losses (4–7 overall, 3–4 in the Big East).

Schedule

Roster

References

West Virginia
West Virginia Mountaineers football seasons
West Virginia Mountaineers football